Center Grove is an extinct town in Atchison County, in the U.S. state of Missouri. The GNIS classifies it as a populated place, but the precise location of the town site is unknown.

A post office called Center Grove was established in 1858, and remained in operation until 1866. The community was named for its location at the geographical center of Lincoln Township.

References

Ghost towns in Missouri
Former populated places in Atchison County, Missouri